Oxenden is a surname. Notable people with the surname include:

Ashton Oxenden
Charles Oxenden, English cricketer
George Oxenden (disambiguation)
Sir Henry Oxenden, 3rd Baronet
Sir James Oxenden, 2nd Baronet, English MP
Oxenden Baronets

See also
 Oxendon (disambiguation)